MI-1 or MI1 may refer to:

 MI1, a department of the British Directorate of Military Intelligence
 Mil Mi-1, a Soviet three- or four-seat light utility helicopter